Jevgēņijs Ņerugals (born 26 February 1989) is a Latvian international footballer who plays for Spartaks Jūrmala, as a goalkeeper.

Career
Born in Daugavpils, Ņerugals has played for Dinaburg FC, BFC Daugavpils, FC Daugava, Ilūkstes NSS and Spartaks Jūrmala.

He made his international debut for Latvia in 2018.

References

1989 births
Living people
Sportspeople from Daugavpils
Latvian footballers
Latvia international footballers
Dinaburg FC players
BFC Daugavpils players
FC Daugava players
Ilūkstes NSS players
FK Spartaks Jūrmala players
Latvian Higher League players
Association football goalkeepers